Favonigobius reichei, the Indopacific Tropical Sand Goby (often simply called "tropical sand goby" (all "sand gobies" are tropical)), is a species of goby native to fresh, brackish and marine waters of coastal areas of the Indian Ocean and the western Pacific Ocean preferring muddy or sandy substrates, often with weed growth.  This species can reach a length of  TL.

References

reichei
Fish described in 1854
Taxonomy articles created by Polbot